Lygaria  or Ligaria, Λυγαριά(el) is an anonymous Greek folkloric tune (syrtos).The meter is .
 It is widespread as a Nisiotika music tune, all over the world.

Original form
The original Greek form of the syrtos is a popular folk dance in Greece (Cyclades). It is widespread as a Nisiotika music tune, all over the world.

See also
Armenaki

References

Year of song unknown
Greek songs
Songwriter unknown